The 2020 Qatar Open (also known as 2020 Qatar ExxonMobil Open for sponsorship reasons) was the 28th edition of the Qatar Open, a men's tennis tournament which is played on outdoor hard courts. It was part of the ATP Tour 250 of the 2020 ATP Tour. It took place at the Khalifa International Tennis and Squash Complex in Doha, Qatar from 6 to 11 January 2020. The tournament was awarded the Tournament of the Year award in the 250 category from the 2019 ATP Awards for the third time in five years.

Points and prize money

Point distribution

Prize money 

*per team

Singles main-draw entrants

Seeds 

 1 Rankings are as of 30 December 2019.

Other entrants 
The following players received wildcards into the singles main draw:
  Marco Cecchinato
  Malek Jaziri
  Cem İlkel

The following players received entry from the qualifying draw:
  Grégoire Barrère 
  Márton Fucsovics 
  Corentin Moutet 
  Mikael Ymer

Withdrawals
  Alexandr Dolgopolov → replaced by  Tennys Sandgren
  Richard Gasquet → replaced by  Kyle Edmund

Doubles main-draw entrants

Seeds 

 1 Rankings are as of 30 December 2019.

Other entrants 
The following pairs received wildcards into the doubles main draw:
  Márton Fucsovics /  Fernando Verdasco 
  Malek Jaziri /  Rashed Nawaf

The following pair received entry as alternates:
  Egor Gerasimov /  Mikhail Kukushkin

Withdrawals 
Before the tournament
  Fernando Verdasco

Champions

Singles 

  Andrey Rublev def.  Corentin Moutet, 6–2, 7–6(7–3)

Doubles 

  Rohan Bopanna /  Wesley Koolhof def.  Luke Bambridge /  Santiago González, 3–6, 6–2, [10–6]

References

External links 
 

 
2020 ATP Tour
2020
2020 in Qatari sport
January 2020 sports events in Asia